Pash is an album released by Australian recording artist Kate Ceberano in May 1998.

Ceberano stated in her 2014 autobiography that the album Pash is "naked, unabashed pop" but the most personal album she has ever made: "It had taken me fifteen years to get to the point where I was confident enough to make decisions and to see them through. Before Pash I had been too willing to let others make the decisions for me, even when it was my band and my face on the album cover. I didn't trust my own instincts as an artist. Pash was the artistic breakthrough I needed. I wrote or co-wrote all the tracks".

Ceberano explains that she wrote the song "Courage" with Mark Goldenberg as a wedding present for her mother. She was inspired by her mother's statement, "I can't believe I've found a man who has the courage to love me".

Track listing

Credits
 Peter Bernstein – string arrangement (track 3)
 Suzy Katayama – string arrangement
 Kevin McCormick – bass (tracks 2, 5–8 and 12)
 Daniel Smith – cello (tracks 4, 8 and 10)
 Rudolph Stein – cello (tracks 8 and 10)
 Mauricio Lewak – drums (tracks 2, 3, 5–8 and 12)
 Mark Goldenberg – arrangement, guitar, keyboards, production, programming, recording, steel guitar (track 11)
 Roger Moutenot – mixing
 David Nottingham – mixing assistance
 Bob Salcedo – string recording
 Eve Sprecher – violin (tracks 8 and 10)
 Robin Lorentz – violin (tracks 8 and 10)

Charts

Certification

References

Kate Ceberano albums
1998 albums
Mushroom Records albums